William James O'Neill (April 25, 1910 – October 27, 2000) was an American football back who played two seasons in the National Football League with the Detroit Lions and Cleveland Rams. He played college football at the University of Detroit Mercy and attended Archbishop Quigley Preparatory Seminary in Chicago, Illinois.

References

External links
Just Sports Stats

1910 births
2000 deaths
Players of American football from Chicago
American football running backs
Detroit Titans football players
Detroit Lions players
Cleveland Rams players